The Socotran rock gecko (Hemidactylus inintellectus) is a species of gecko. It is endemic to Socotra.

References

Hemidactylus
Reptiles described in 2009
Reptiles of the Middle East
Endemic fauna of Socotra